Frank Worroll (5 July 1877 – 19 September 1940) was an Australian rules footballer who played with South Melbourne in the Victorian Football League (VFL).

Notes

External links 

1877 births
1940 deaths
Australian rules footballers from Melbourne
Sydney Swans players
Williamstown Football Club players
Australian military personnel of World War I
People from Williamstown, Victoria
Military personnel from Melbourne